Zach Warren (born 1981) is an American circus performer and psychologist. In 2005, he began working with the Afghan Mobile Mini Children's Circus and was Director of Policy Research for The Asia Foundation between 2014-2017. He is known for breaking world records in unicycling and juggling.

Education
Warren is an alumnus of Earlham College with a degree in Human Development and Social Relations, Harvard Divinity School, and Georgetown University.<ref>Georgetown Department of Psychology (February 6, 2016) "Zachary Warren"</ref> His PhD advisor was Fathali M. Moghaddam.

Joggling
In 2005 and 2006, he broke the Guinness World Record for "fastest marathon while juggling," with a time of 2 hours and 52 minutes, but lost the record to Canadian Michal Kapral in 2007.Book of Alternative Records (2006) "Marathon Joggling" The battle between Warren and Kapral is featured in the 2011 documentary film Breaking and Entering''.

See also

 Joggling

References

1981 births
Living people
Harvard Divinity School alumni
Place of birth missing (living people)
Jugglers
American male long-distance runners
American male marathon runners
Earlham College alumni